Gaya College of Engineering is a public state university in Gaya, Bihar, India, affiliated to Aryabhatta Knowledge University, Patna and approved by AICTE, Ministry of Education.

It was formerly named 'Magadh Engineering College (MEC)' from 1981 to 1994 under affiliation from Magadh University, Bodhgaya; now it is a public institute under name 'Gaya College of Engineering (GCE)'. It was inaugurated by the then Chief Minister of Bihar  Nitish Kumar on 19 November 2008 in presence of renowned dignitaries and educationists at a function held in college campus itself.

History 
In 1958, Magadh Engineering College was established. It ran from 1958 to 1994. It was revived and inaugurated as Gaya College of Engineering by the Chief Minister of Bihar on 19 November 2008.

Campus 
The campus is situated at Bihar State Highway-4 Shrikrishnanagar locality on the outskirts of Gaya district, fifteen km from the main town. The college is spread over 87 acres. There are two academic buildings, one workshop and two campus hostels for third year and final year students. The area is lush green and free from pollution.
A single small tea shop is available on the campus.

A branch of Dakshin Bihar Gramin Bank is Functional here serving the needs of all students.

Departments 
GCE offers undergraduate courses in four streams of engineering.

Academics

Admission 
From 2019 onwards, admission is done on the basis of rank obtained in JEE Main, conducted by National Testing Agency and through BCECE Lateral Entry. Earlier, undergraduate admissions were done through the BCECE conducted by Bihar Combined Entrance Competitive Examination Board. The Department of Science and Technology holds the UGEAC counselling for admission.

Library 
A central library which has all essential books available for students.

Student life

Hostel 
There are two new hostels along with an old hostel provided for College staffs & Guards, third and fourth-year students in the college campus. All hostels have telephones, television, Common room, indoor games court as well as WiMAX. All rooms are single seated for the students. A mess with dining room is functioning in the hostel, breakfast, lunch, and dinner are served.
There are also some private hostels providing accommodation to the students at Gaya Junction and Lakhibagh, Manpur Junction for boys and Nutan Nagar for girls.
From the Gaya Junction, Manpur and Nutan Nagar at 6 am (classes start at 7 am) during the Summer period and Timing is elevated to 8:30 am for bus plying and 10 am for a class start during Winters.

Celebrations 
 Annual Function is organized every year to commemorate the foundation day of the college. Annual sports meet and Cultural programs are held along with it.
 The mega tech. fest 'GRAVITON'
 ADAVYA once organized in 2011.
 SUMEDHA organized every year
Besides Saraswati Puja, Vishwakarma Puja, Farewell Party, Welcome Party and Freshers' party act as a source to inculcate zeal and joy in within.

Philanthropy GCEians 
It is a student social activity cell of Gaya College of Engineering.

See also 
 List of institutions of higher education in Bihar
 Education in Bihar
 Education in India

References

External links
 BCECE Board website
 Aryabhatta Knowledge University website
 DST, Bihar website

Engineering colleges in Bihar
Education in Gaya, India
Educational institutions established in 2008
Colleges affiliated to Aryabhatta Knowledge University
2008 establishments in Bihar